This article shows a list of railway stations in Germany. The list is subdivided per federal state. Due to the number of railway stations it shows a selection of the principal stations and links to related state articles. Where there are 2 or more passenger stations in a large town or city, the most important is often designated by the Deutsche Bahn as the Hauptbahnhof (German for "main station"), of which there are 122 in total.

Railway stations

Baden-Württemberg

Freiburg Hauptbahnhof
Karlsruhe Hauptbahnhof
Mannheim Hauptbahnhof
Stuttgart Hauptbahnhof
Ulm Hauptbahnhof

Bavaria

Augsburg Hauptbahnhof
Bayreuth Hauptbahnhof
Fürth Hauptbahnhof
Ingolstadt Hauptbahnhof
München Hauptbahnhof
München Ost
München-Pasing
Nürnberg Hauptbahnhof
Passau Hauptbahnhof
Regensburg Hauptbahnhof
Rosenheim
Würzburg Hauptbahnhof

Berlin

Berlin Gesundbrunnen
Berlin Hauptbahnhof
Berlin Ostbahnhof
Berlin-Spandau
Berlin Südkreuz
Berlin Zoologischer Garten

Brandenburg

Brandenburg Hauptbahnhof
Cottbus
Potsdam Hauptbahnhof

Bremen

Bremen Hauptbahnhof
Bremerhaven Hauptbahnhof

Hamburg

Hamburg-Altona
Hamburg Dammtor
Hamburg-Harburg
Hamburg Hauptbahnhof

Hesse

Darmstadt Hauptbahnhof
Frankfurt Hauptbahnhof
Frankfurt Flughafen
Fulda
Kassel Hauptbahnhof
Kassel-Wilhelmshöhe
Wiesbaden Hauptbahnhof

Lower Saxony
 
Braunschweig Hauptbahnhof
Göttingen
Hanover Hauptbahnhof
Oldenburg Hauptbahnhof
Osnabrück Hauptbahnhof
Wolfsburg Hauptbahnhof

Mecklenburg-Vorpommern

Greifswald
Rostock Hauptbahnhof
Schwerin Hauptbahnhof
Stralsund
Wismar

North Rhine-Westphalia

Aachen Hauptbahnhof
Bielefeld Hauptbahnhof
Bochum Hauptbahnhof
Bonn Hauptbahnhof
Cologne Hauptbahnhof
Cologne/Bonn Airport
Cologne Deutz
Dortmund Hauptbahnhof
Duisburg Hauptbahnhof
Düsseldorf Hauptbahnhof
Essen Hauptbahnhof
Gelsenkirchen Hauptbahnhof
Hagen Hauptbahnhof
Mönchengladbach Hauptbahnhof
Münster Hauptbahnhof
Neuss Hauptbahnhof
Oberhausen Hauptbahnhof
Siegen
Wuppertal Hauptbahnhof

Rhineland-Palatinate

Kaiserslautern Hauptbahnhof
Koblenz Hauptbahnhof
Ludwigshafen Hauptbahnhof
Mainz Hauptbahnhof
Trier Hauptbahnhof

Saarland

Saarbrücken Hauptbahnhof

Saxony

Chemnitz Hauptbahnhof
Döbeln Hauptbahnhof
Dresden Hauptbahnhof
Görlitz
Leipzig Hauptbahnhof
Meißen
Plauen (Vogtland) Oberer Bahnhof

Saxony-Anhalt 

Dessau Hauptbahnhof
Halle Hauptbahnhof
Magdeburg Hauptbahnhof

Schleswig-Holstein

Kiel Hauptbahnhof
Lübeck Hauptbahnhof

Thuringia

Erfurt Hauptbahnhof
Gera Hauptbahnhof
Jena Paradies

Maps

Deutsche Bahn station code

External links

German rail map at Bueker.net

 
Railway stations
 Germany